The Dauphin County Law Library was established by the Pennsylvania General Assembly in 1865 and has been housed in its present location at the Dauphin County Courthouse in Harrisburg, Pennsylvania. The Law Library now has approximately 35,000 volumes, down from the 47,000. These volumes focus on statute and case law for the Commonwealth of Pennsylvania and the Federal Courts. The Library houses all of the published opinions of judges in each county.  The legal periodical of Dauphin County is the called the Dauphin County Reporter and it includes opinions from eight judges. The Law Library is open to the public.

L
Libraries in Pennsylvania
Public libraries in Pennsylvania
Law libraries in the United States
Law library
1865 establishments in Pennsylvania